Steven Silver (born February 1, 1989) is an American actor, known for his roles in 13 Reasons Why and Council of Dads.

Career 
A native of Houston, Texas, Silver made his acting debut in The Problem with Mr. Withers, a short film. He was then cast as Marcus Cole in 13 Reasons Why, appearing as a reoccurring character in the first two seasons. Silver appeared as a minor character in All the Little Things We Kill, which starred RJ Mitte, Elizabeth Marvel, and Scott Cohen. In 2019, Silver starred in The Obituary of Tunde Johnson, an independent drama directed by Ali LeRoi. Silver will appear in the NBC television series Council of Dads.

Filmography

References

External links

African-American male actors
Male actors from Houston
American male television actors
American male film actors
Living people
1989 births
21st-century African-American people
20th-century African-American people